Identification Marks: None is a 1965 Polish drama film directed by Jerzy Skolimowski. It was the first feature film directed by Skolimowski, after the shorts Erotique, Little Hamlet, The Menacing Eye, Boxing and Your Money or Your Life.

The film is the first to feature Skolimowski's alter ego, Andrzej Leszczyc. In 29 shots, it shows Andrzej waking, leaving his sleeping girlfriend as he reports for conscription, having decided to quit his life as a student of ichthyology. The film follows his remaining hours of civilian life.

Cast 
 Elżbieta Czyżewska as Teresa/Barbara/Leszczyc's wife
 Jerzy Skolimowski as Andrzej Leszczyc
 Jacek Szczęk as Mundek
 Juliusz Lubicz-Lisowski as man in the telephone booth
 Marek Piwowski as man in the draft office
 Tadeusz Minc
 Andrzej Żarnecki

External links

References

Films directed by Jerzy Skolimowski
Films with screenplays by Jerzy Skolimowski
1960s Polish-language films
Polish drama films

1965 drama films
1965 films